Ravelston is a suburb of Edinburgh, Scotland.

Ravelston may also refer to:

 SS Ravelston, a steamship
 Ravelston Corporation, a Canadian company